The Commander of the Romanian Navy is the chief commanding authority of the Romanian Navy. The position dates to the period of the United Principalities. The current Commander of the Romanian Navy, since 1 July 2020, is Mihai Panait.

List of Commanders

United Principalities (1860–1881)

Kingdom of Romania (1881–1947)

Socialist Republic of Romania (1947–1989)

Romania (1989–present)

References

 
 
 
 

Romania
Romanian Naval Forces officers